Nah or NAH may refer to:

Places
 Naha Airport (Indonesia) (IATA airport code: NAH), Tahuna, Sangir Islands, North Sulawesi, Indonesia
 Nehbandan or Nah, a city in South Khorasan Province, Iran

Other uses
 NaH, the chemical formula of sodium hydride
 Nahuatl (ISO language code: nah), a Uto-Aztecan language spoken in Mexico and El Salvador
 Ix Ek' Naah, a Mayan queen
 Nah Dove (born 1940s), author, lecturer and scholar in African-American studies